Gangda may be:
The Mandarin reading of the colloquial name for the University of Hong Kong
185535 Gangda, a minor planet
A district in Junagadh, Gujarat, India with pin code 362560

See also
Ganda (disambiguation)